Burial Rites (2013) is a novel by Australian author Hannah Kent, based on a true story.

Background 
Kent was given inspiration to write Burial Rites during her time as an exchange student in Iceland when she was 17, where she learnt the story of Agnes Magnúsdóttir. She then made it the topic of her honours degree at Flinders University, and the subject of her PhD, with additional mentoring being given by Geraldine Brooks, after this, Kent was awarded the Writing Australia Unpublished Manuscript Award in 2011.

Plot summary 

Burial Rites tells the story of Agnes Magnúsdóttir, a servant in northern Iceland who was condemned to death after the murder of two men, one of whom was her employer, and became the last woman put to death in Iceland.

Notes 

 Burial Rites was included in the VCE text response texts from 2014.
 Dedication: For my Family
 Included in the QCAA prescribed text list in 2020.

Reviews 

 The Guardian
 Sydney Review of Books

Interviews 

 The Australian - "Hannah Kent's debut novel Burial Rites is written in cold blood" by Stephen Romei

Awards and nominations 

 2011 inaugural winner Writing Australia Unpublished Manuscript Award 
 2013 shortlisted 'The Nib': CAL Waverley Library Award for Literature 
 2013 shortlisted Guardian First Book Award 
 2013 winner 'The Nib': CAL Waverley Library Award for Literature — The Alex Buzo Shortlist Prize 
 2014 shortlisted Victorian Premier's Literary Awards — Fiction 
 2014 winner Victorian Premier's Literary Awards — People's Choice Award 
 2014 winner Indie Awards — Debut Fiction 
 2014 shortlisted Stella Prize 
 2014 shortlisted ASAL Awards — ALS Gold Medal 
 2014 shortlisted Women's Prize for Fiction (UK) — Baileys Women's Prize for Fiction 
 2014 winner Australian Book Industry Awards (ABIA) — Australian Literary Fiction Book of the Year 
 2014 winner Nielsen BookData Booksellers Choice Award — Australian Booksellers Association
 2014 winner Australian Book Industry Awards (ABIA) — Booktopia People's Choice Award 
 2014 shortlisted Davitt Award — Best Adult Crime Novel 
 2014 winner Davitt Award — Best Debut Crime Novel 
 2014 winner Davitt Award — Readers' Choice Award 
 2014 shortlisted National Book Awards (UK) — International Author of the Year 
 2014 shortlisted Voss Literary Prize 
 2015 shortlisted International Dublin Literary Award

Film
In 2017, it was announced that Luca Guadagnino will direct a film adaptation starring Jennifer Lawrence.

References

External links 

 Burial Rites, Official Publisher Site

2013 Australian novels
Novels set in Iceland
2013 debut novels
Fiction set in 1829
Pan Books books
Picador (imprint) books